North Warwickshire is a constituency represented in the House of Commons of the UK Parliament since 2015 by Craig Tracey, a Conservative.

Members of Parliament

MPs 1832–1885

MPs since 1983

Constituency profile
Warwickshire North has wards which are the most "working-class" (lowest average income) and industrial of the six constituencies in the county, politically frequently with the best returns locally for Labour candidates. In the 2010 election all six Warwickshire constituencies were won by the Conservative party, though this constituency was the most marginal, falling on a substantial swing of 8.1% from Labour to the Conservatives (compared to a national swing of 5%).

Many towns and villages have a history of coal mining and heavy industry, linked to a strong Labour vote.

Settlements include Bedworth, just north of Coventry, and the historic market town of Atherstone.

Boundaries

The constituency since 2010 has all but two wards of North Warwickshire.

1832–1885: The Hundred of Hemlingford, the County of the City of Coventry, and the Rugby and Kirby Divisions of the Hundred of Knightlow.

1983–2010: The Borough of North Warwickshire, and the Borough of Nuneaton and Bedworth wards of Exhall, Heath, Mount Pleasant, and Poplar.

2010–present: The Borough of North Warwickshire wards of Atherstone Central, Atherstone North, Atherstone South and Mancetter, Baddesley and Grendon, Coleshill North, Coleshill South, Curdworth, Dordon, Fillongley, Hurley and Wood End, Kingsbury, Newton Regis and Warton, Polesworth East, Polesworth West, and Water Orton, and the Borough of Nuneaton and Bedworth wards of Bede, Exhall, Heath, Poplar, and Slough.

History

History 1832–1885

The North Warwickshire constituency was created for the 1832 general election, when the Great Reform Act divided the former Warwickshire constituency into two new divisions: North Warwickshire and South Warwickshire.

Under the Redistribution of Seats Act 1885, North Warwickshire was abolished for the 1885 general election, when Warwickshire was divided into six new single-member constituencies: Rugby, Stratford-on-Avon, Nuneaton, Sutton Coldfield, Erdington and Tamworth.

History 1983–present
The current North Warwickshire county constituency was created for the 1983 general election, replacing outlying parts of the Meriden and Nuneaton constituencies.   The seat was won by Francis Maude of the Conservative Party at the 1983 general election, who held it until 1992, when it was taken by Mike O'Brien of Labour.  Labour held the seat comfortably until 2010.

On 8 March 2007, former Army Officer and polar explorer Dan Byles was selected at an open primary to contest North Warwickshire for the Conservative Party. At the 2010 general election, Byles won the seat off Mike O'Brien by just 54 votes, making him the Conservative Member of Parliament with the smallest majority in the country. However, a strong Conservative performance during the latter part of the decade saw the seat become safer for the Conservatives - the result in 2019 being akin to a safe Conservative seat.

Elections

Elections in the 2010s

]]

Elections in the 2000s

Elections in the 1990s

Elections in the 1980s

Elections in the 1880s

 Caused by Bromley-Davenport's death.

Elections in the 1870s

Elections in the 1860s

 
 

 
  

 Caused by Spooner's death.

Elections in the 1850s

Elections in the 1840s

 
   

   

 Caused by Eardley-Wilmot's resignation after being appointed Governor of Tasmania

Elections in the 1830s

See also
 List of parliamentary constituencies in Warwickshire

Notes

References

Parliamentary constituencies in Warwickshire
Constituencies of the Parliament of the United Kingdom established in 1832
Constituencies of the Parliament of the United Kingdom disestablished in 1885
Constituencies of the Parliament of the United Kingdom established in 1983